The Spanish Christmas Lottery (officially Sorteo Extraordinario de Navidad  or simply Lotería de Navidad ) is a special draw of the Lotería Nacional, the weekly national lottery run by Spain's state-owned Loterías y Apuestas del Estado. The special Christmas draw takes place every December 22 and it is the biggest and most popular draw of the year.

Lotería Nacional, with its first draw held on 4 March 1812, is the second-longest continuously running lottery in the world. This includes the years during the Spanish Civil War when the lottery draws were held in Valencia after the Republicans were forced to relocate their capital from Madrid. After the overthrow of the Republican government, the lottery continued uninterrupted in Francoist Spain. The first Christmas draw was held on 18 December 1812 in Cádiz and the grand prize was for the number 03604. The first time that the name Sorteo de Navidad was used was in 1892.

As measured by the total prize payout, the Spanish Christmas Lottery is considered the biggest lottery draw worldwide. In 2022, with 180 million pre-printed €20 tickets to sell (décimos), the maximum total amount available for all prizes would be €2.52 billion (seventy per cent of ticket sales). The total amount for the grand prize El Gordo ("the big one") would be €720 million.

In the Spanish-speaking and the English-speaking media it is sometimes just called El Gordo, even though that name really refers to the grand prize for any Spanish lottery.

Ticket numbers and prizes

As all Lotería Nacional draws, the special Christmas draw is based on tickets (billetes) which have five-digit numbers, from 00000 to 99999. Since this system only produces 100,000 unique ticket numbers, each ticket number is printed multiple times, in several so-called series (series). The series is also identified on each ticket by a series number. In this way, the lottery organizer is able to sell more than 100,000 tickets each year, numbered from "Series 001 Ticket 00000" through "Series xxx Ticket 99999", where xxx is the total number of series printed in a given year. In 2022, there are 180 series of 100,000 tickets each, for a total of 18,000,000 tickets available at €200 each. If all €3.6 billion tickets were sold, there would be €2.52 billion (seventy per cent of ticket sales) available for prizes.

Because the €200 ticket price may be prohibitive for many purchasers, each of the pre-printed tickets is actually a perforated tear-apart sheet of ten identical sub-tickets (or fractions) sold for €20 each. Each one of these fractions is known as a décimo (one-tenth). Each décimo is entitled a ten per cent of any prize that the ticket has won.

Tickets are officially sold in official lottery shops (administraciones) throughout the country as well as by licensed (and unlicensed) sellers on the street. Frequently a shop will sell a ticket number in all series meaning all the winners of that ticket will have purchased their tickets in that location. This sometimes leads to a small village full of grand prize winners. Locations where previous grand prize winners were sold (El Gordo) often becomes a location of lottery pilgrimage where thousands of people (both local and from far away) will queue and buy their ticket at this location "for luck". The tickets are also sold outside of Spain, usually online (legally or illegally) often with a notable markup in price.

On a private basis, or through associations, charities, workplaces, sports teams, cafés, shops, and other organizations, it is also possible to buy or be given a fraction of a décimo (one-tenth ticket), called a participación (a share). Many organizations buy décimos and divide them further into shares and sell them to the public, colleagues, or members of an association. Usually, with charities and special organizations, a small transaction fee is applied which is effectively a donation to the organization. Street sellers may take a commission earning a small profit. Participaciones (shares) are made by writing the ticket number and the amount paid on a piece of paper (possibly on a photocopy of the ticket) and then signed. The paper is a legal contract in Spain and proof of participation in the ticket. If the ticket is a winner, anyone holding a share will be entitled to their proportional amount of the prize payout. For example, a charity may buy a décimo (one-tenth ticket) and split it further into ten more participaciones (shares), in this case selling them for €2 each plus €1 extra as a donation to the charity. If their number wins, they will get a one per cent of the prize (one-tenth of one-tenth).

For 2022, there are 180 series of 100,000 billetes (from 00000 to 99999) at €200 each. The maximum ticket sales of €3.6 billion would produce a prize payout of €2.52 billion (seventy per cent of ticket sales). For each one of the 180 series, the prize structure is the following:

In 2022, the €4,000,000 El Gordo was paid to every series of number 05490. Every series of numbers 05489 and 05491 obtained the corresponding €20,000 approximation prizes. Additionally, every series of numbers between 05400 and 05499 (excluding El Gordo but including approximations) obtained the €1,000 prizes for the numbers with the same first three digits of El Gordo. Every series of numbers ending in "90" (excluding El Gordo) obtained €1,000, and every series of numbers ending in "0" (excluding El Gordo) obtained a refund of €200.

The exact quantity of tickets and series, and their prices, may be  different each year. For example, in 2004, there were 66,000 different numbers in 195 series. In 2005, there were 85,000 numbers in 170 series, whereas in 2006 the number of series was increased to 180. Since 2011 there are 100,000 different numbers in 180 series. Distribution of prizes can change also, as in 2002 with the introduction of the Euro, or in 2011, when El Gordo increased from €3,000,000 to €4,000,000, the Second Prize increased from €1,000,000 to €1,250,000, the Fifth Prizes increased from €50,000 to €60,000, and 20 more pedreas of €1,000 were added. In 2013 the number of series has been reduced from 180 to 160 to adjust to the expected demand. In 2017 the number of series has been increased from 160 to 170, in 2020, to 172; and in 2022, to 180.

Odds 
The overall odds of winning a prize in Lotería de Navidad are 1:6.5.

Draw 

The drawing traditionally takes place on 22 December. In the past, the drawings took place in the Lotería Nacional hall in Madrid, in 2010 and 2011 it was held at the Palacio Municipal de Congresos de Madrid, and since 2012 in Teatro Real in Madrid. Pupils of the San Ildefonso school (formerly reserved for orphans of public servants) draw the numbers and corresponding prizes, delivering the results in song to the public. Until 1984, only boys from San Ildefonso participated in the drawing; that year Mónica Rodríguez became the first girl to sing the results, including the fourth prize of 25 million Spanish pesetas.  It is a custom that the winners donate some of the money to the San Ildefonso school. The public attending the event may be dressed in lottery-related extravagant clothing and hats. The state-run Televisión Española and Radio Nacional de España, and other media outlets, broadcast the entire draw, it is also livestreamed.

Two large spherical cages are used. The largest one contains 100,000 small wooden balls, each with a unique five-digit ticket number on it, from 00000 to 99999. The smaller cage contains 1,807 small wooden balls, each one representing a prize written in Euros:

 1 ball for the first prize, called El Gordo.
 1 ball for the second prize.
 1 ball for the third prize.
 2 balls for the fourth prizes.
 8 balls for the fifth prizes.
 1,794 balls for the small prizes, called la Pedrea, literally "the pebble-avalanche" or "stoning".

Inscriptions on the wooden balls are nowadays made with a laser, to avoid any difference in weight between them. Before being thrown into the vessels, the numbers are shown to the public for anyone to check that the balls with their numbers are not missing.

As the drawing goes on, a single ball is extracted from each of the revolving spheres at the same time. One child sings the winning number, the other child sings the corresponding prize. This is repeated until the smaller cage (the prize-balls) has been emptied. Due to the sheer number of prizes, this procedure takes many hours. The children work in about eight to nine shifts, equal to the number of frames of numbers to be drawn.

The balls have holes on them so they can be placed onto long wires, which are stored in frames for later presentation. When a major prize is drawn, both children pause, sing the prize and ticket number multiple times and show the balls to a committee, and then to a fixed camera with two Phillips screwdriver heads mounted at the front, all before being inserted into a frame as the others. Although the drawing is by chance, the children who draw the higher prizes are applauded. Apart from the prizes drawn from the vessel, some prizes are calculated from the winning numbers (view the table with prizes above). Once the grand prize (El Gordo) is declared, this number is instantly broadcast on television, online and on public screens.

The two-vessels system was the traditional system used by Lotería Nacional in its draws, but nowadays it is only used in the special Christmas draw. Since 1965 the rest of the ordinary and special Lotería Nacional draws use five spherical cages with ten balls each (numbered 0 to 9), from where the five digits of the winning numbers are drawn.

The smallest prize is the reintegro, tickets that end with a certain digit get the money back. That means ten per cent of all tickets get the money back. There is a 5.3% chance of winning higher prizes meaning more than ten per cent of all tickets win some prize which is a significantly higher winning rate than most other lotteries. The prize structure makes it easier to win some money compared to other lotteries, and it is common saying that the prizes of the Christmas Lottery are well distributed all around Spain. Chances of winning El Gordo are 1 in 100,000, that is 0.001%, while chances of winning the top prize of EuroMillions are 1 in 139,838,160 or 0.00000072%, and chances of winning the top prize of Mega Millions are 1 in 302,575,350 or 0.00000000330496189%.

Non-winners are known to claim "it's health that really matters" after losing. Those who get their money back often re-invest it in a ticket for Sorteo Extraordinario de El Niño, the second most important Lotería Nacional draw, held every January 6, the Epiphany of Jesus day.

El Gordo
The climax of the drawing is the moment when El Gordo is drawn. Lottery outlets usually only sell tickets for one or two numbers, so the winners of the largest prizes often live in the same town or area or work for the same company. In 2011, El Gordo was sold entirely in Grañén, Huesca, a town with about 2,000 people. In 2010, €414 million from the first prize were sold in Barcelona, and the rest of the €585 million of El Gordo was distributed between Madrid, Tenerife, Alicante, Palencia, Zaragoza, Cáceres, and Guipúzcoa. In 2006, the winning number was sold in eight different lottery outlets across Spain, while the second prize number (€100,000 per décimo) was only ever sold from a kiosk on the Puerta del Sol in central Madrid. In 2005, the winning number was sold in the town of Vic in Catalonia (population 37,825), whose inhabitants shared about €500 million (€300,000 per winning décimo).

As a misconception in many non-Spanish speaking countries, it is often assumed that the term El Gordo is specific for the Christmas Lottery; some even think that El Gordo is in fact the name of the lottery. However, the real meaning of El Gordo is simply "the first prize" (literally "the fat one" or more accurately "the big one"); other lotteries have their Gordo as well. To add to the confusion, there is a relatively new weekly Spanish lottery game called El Gordo de la Primitiva, which has nothing in common with the Christmas lottery, except the fact that it is organized by the Spanish public lottery entity Loterías y Apuestas del Estado.

References

External links 
 Loterías y Apuestas del Estado official page
 Rural Spanish housewife clubs win "El Gordo" lottery Reuters. December 22, 2011.

Lotteries in Spain
Spanish culture
Christmas events and celebrations
Christmas in Spain